The Women's football tournament at the 2019 Pan American Games was held in Lima during July and August 2019.

Qualification
A total of eight women's teams qualified to compete at the games, four CONMEBOL teams and four CONCACAF teams. For CONMEBOL, the three teams ranked third to fifth at the 2018 Copa América Femenina qualified, while Peru automatically qualified as hosts. For CONCACAF, the best team from each of the three zones (North American, Central American and Caribbean) at the 2018 CONCACAF Women's Championship qualified; however, both United States and Canada declined to participate to focus on the 2019 FIFA Women's World Cup, so Mexico qualified for the North American berth, while Costa Rica also qualified by decision of CONCACAF.

Qualified teams

Draw
The draw of the tournament was held on 12 April 2019, 12:00 PET (UTC−5), at the Peruvian Football Federation headquarters in Lima, Peru. The eight teams were drawn into two groups of four and each group had two CONCACAF teams and two CONMEBOL teams. The hosts Peru were seeded into group B and assigned to position 4 in their group, while the remaining seven teams were placed into two pots according to the confederation to which they belong.

The CONCACAF teams were drawn first and assigned to positions 1 and 2 in groups A and B. Then, the CONMEBOL teams were drawn and the first two teams occupied positions 3 and 4 in group A while the third team occupied the position 3 in group B. The draw resulted in the following groups:

The draw was led by Hugo Figueredo, competition director of CONMEBOL, and had the help of Miriam Tristan and Cindy Novoa, members of the Peru women's national football team.

Squads

There are no age restrictions for the women's event.

Group stage
Tie-breakers 

All times are local, PET (UTC−5).

Group A

Group B

Placement stage (5th–8th place)

Seventh place match

Fifth place match

Knockout stage
If necessary, extra time and penalty shoot-out would be used to decide the winner.

Semi-finals

Bronze medal match

Gold medal match

Final standings

Goalscorers

References

External links

 
Football at the 2019 Pan American Games
Pan American Games